Cinanserin (INN) is a 5-HT2A and 5-HT2C receptor antagonist which was discovered in the 1960s.

The molecule is an inhibitor of the 3C-like protease of SARS-coronavirus (SARS).

See also 
 Sarpogrelate
 Ketanserin
 Ritanserin

References 

5-HT2A antagonists
5-HT2C antagonists
Thioethers
Anilides
Abandoned drugs